Sun-woo "Sunny" Kim (Korean: 김선우, Hanja: 金善宇, ; born September 4, 1977) is a retired South Korean professional baseball pitcher of the Korea Baseball Organization. He has previously played in Major League Baseball for the Boston Red Sox, Montreal Expos/Washington Nationals, Colorado Rockies, and Cincinnati Reds. He bats and throws right-handed.

Pro career
In his career, Kim has pitched in 110 games, starting 37, recording 13 wins against 13 losses. He was the starting pitcher of the Montreal Expos at the organization's final game at Montreal on September 29, 2004, lasting just over two innings. On September 24, Kim pitched complete game shut out against San Francisco Giants at Coors Field, leading the team's 6-0 victory.

He was acquired by the Cincinnati Reds on September 5, 2006 from the Colorado Rockies in exchange for future considerations. Kim was released from the Reds after the 2006 season. After playing one season in the minor leagues, he signed with the Doosan Bears in the Korea Baseball Organization at the end of 2007. Kim posted a 57-45 record and a 4.27 ERA in 6 seasons with the Bears. His best season was 2011, when he won 16 games (against 7 losses), pitching 175.2 innings in 28 games with a 3.13 ERA. 
After a dreadful season in 2013, (5-6, 5.52 ERA and only pitched 60.2 innings due to injury), Kim was waived by the Bears. He then joined the LG Twins, where he played his final season.

Family
Kim is the cousin of Lee Junho, who is a member of the boy band 2PM.

References

External links

Career statistics and player information from Korea Baseball Organization

1977 births
Living people
Baseball players at the 1996 Summer Olympics
Boston Red Sox players
Cincinnati Reds players
Colorado Springs Sky Sox players
Colorado Rockies players
Doosan Bears players
Edmonton Trappers players
Fresno Grizzlies players
KBO League pitchers
LG Twins players
Major League Baseball pitchers
Major League Baseball players from South Korea
Montreal Expos players
New Orleans Zephyrs players
Olympic baseball players of South Korea
Ottawa Lynx players
Pawtucket Red Sox players
South Korean expatriate baseball players in Canada
South Korean expatriate baseball players in the United States
Sportspeople from Incheon
Washington Nationals players
2006 World Baseball Classic players